William Mitchell Byers (May 1, 1927 – May 1, 1996) was an American jazz trombonist and arranger.

Early life
Byers was born in Los Angeles on May 1, 1927. He suffered from arthritis from a young age and was unable to continue his plans of a career as a pianist.

Career
Byers picked up trombone and played with Karl Kiffe before serving in the United States Army in 1944 and 1945. In the second half of the 1940s he arranged and played trombone for Georgie Auld, Buddy Rich, Benny Goodman, Charlie Ventura, and Teddy Powell. Following this he composed for WMGM (AM) radio and television in New York City. In the middle of the 1950s he was in Paris arranging; he also led a session of his own, released as Jazz on the Left Bank, at this time. Later in the 1950s in Europe he played with Harold Arlen (1959–1960) and with the orchestra of Quincy Jones. He became Jones's assistant at Mercury Records in the 1960s, and arranged for Count Basie albums. He also recorded some Duke Ellington standards on his own. He toured Europe and Japan alongside Frank Sinatra in 1974. Byers had extensive credits arranging and conducting for film, and won the Drama Desk Award for Outstanding Orchestrations for City of Angels.

Personal life 
Byers died in Malibu, California, on May 1, 1996. Material from his career is held by the Library of Congress in Washington, D.C.

Discography

As leader/co-leader
The Jazz Workshop (RCA Victor, 1955)
New Sounds in Swing (Jazztone, 1956) with Joe Newman - also released as Byers' Guide
Jazz on the Left Bank (Epic, 1956) with Martial Solal
Impressions of Duke Ellington (Mercury, 1961)

As sideman
With Count Basie
More Hits of the 50's and 60's (Verve, 1963) - as arranger and conductor
Pop Goes the Basie (Reprise, 1965) - as arranger and conductor
Basie Swingin' Voices Singin' (ABC-Paramount, 1966) with the Alan Copeland Singers 
With Bob Brookmeyer
Gloomy Sunday and Other Bright Moments (Verve, 1961)
With Al Cohn
Mr. Music (RCA Victor, 1955)
With Billy Eckstine
The Golden Hits of Billy Eckstine (Mercury, 1963) - as arranger
With Coleman Hawkins
The Hawk in Hi Fi (RCA Victor, 1956) - as arranger and conductor
With Al Jarreau
Breakin' Away (Warner Bros., 1981) - as arranger
With J. J. Johnson
Goodies (RCA Victor, 1965) as arranger/conductor
With Quincy Jones
The Birth of a Band! (Mercury, 1959)
Quincy Jones Explores the Music of Henry Mancini (Mercury, 1964)
 Golden Boy (Mercury, 1964)
Quincy Plays for Pussycats (Mercury, 1959-65 [1965])
The Great Wide World of Quincy Jones (Mercury, 1959)
With Lee Konitz 
You and Lee (Verve, 1959)
With Jack McDuff
Prelude (Prestige, 1963)
With Gary McFarland
The Jazz Version of "How to Succeed in Business without Really Trying" (Verve, 1962)
With Hal McKusick
Triple Exposure (Prestige, 1957)
With Carmen McRae
Something to Swing About (Kapp, 1959)
With Joe Newman
I Feel Like a Newman (Storyville, 1956)
With Lalo Schifrin
Music from Mission: Impossible (Dot, 1967)
With Bud Shank
Windmills of Your Mind (Pacific Jazz, 1969)

With Charlie Shavers

Excitement Unlimited (Capitol, 1963)

With Julius Watkins
French Horns for My Lady (Philips, 1962) - as arranger
With Andy Williams 
Under Paris Skies (Cadence Records, 1960)
With Cootie Williams
Cootie Williams in Hi-Fi (RCA Victor, 1958)
With Kai Winding
Kai Olé (Verve, 1961)
With Frank Zappa 
The Grand Wazoo (1972)
Waka/Jawaka (1972)

References

Further reading
 "Billy Byers Wins Juvenile Role in Community Play". Van Nuys News and Valley Green Sheet. March 6, 1941. p. 11
 "Conducts Class". Los Angeles Evening Citizen News. July 19, 1941. p. 11
 Markham, Jeanie (November 6, 1942). "Campus Gad-About; Musically Speaking". The Van Nuys News and Valley Green Sheet. p. 13
 McIver, Don L. (June 24, 1956). "Billy Byers Hits Mark as Composer, Arranger". Fort Lauderdale News. p. 58.
 Green, Benny (May 14, 1996). "Jazz's Constant Horn". The Guardian. p. 16.

External links

1927 births
1996 deaths
American jazz trombonists
Male trombonists
Jazz musicians from California
Drama Desk Award winners
Jazz arrangers
20th-century American musicians
20th-century trombonists
20th-century American male musicians
American male jazz musicians